Sri Lanka elects on the national level a head of state – the president – and a legislature. Sri Lanka has a multi-party system, with two dominant political parties. All elections are administered by the Election Commission of Sri Lanka.

President 

The president is directly elected for a five-year term, through a version of Instant-runoff voting in which electors rank up to three candidates, and limited to only two rounds in total. If no candidate wins a majority in the first round of voting, second and third preferences from ballots whose first preference candidate has been eliminated are used to determine the winner. However, there has never been an instance where a "run-off" count has been needed since the introduction of directly elected president in the 1980s, as a candidate reached 50% in the first count in all elections.

Parliament 
The Parliament has 225 members, elected for a five-year term, 196 members elected in multi-seat constituencies through proportional representation system where each party is allocated a number of seats from the quota for each district according to the proportion of the total vote that party obtains in the district. The other 29 which is called the national list are appointed by each party secretary according to the island wide proportional vote the party obtains.

Local Government 
The Local government bodies in Sri Lanka;
 Municipal Councils
 Urban Councils
 Pradeshiya Sabha
are elected through the mixed electoral system.

Latest elections

2019 presidential election

2020 Parliamentary election

See also
 Electoral calendar
 Electoral system

References

External links
Department of Elections
Adam Carr's Election Archive
www.Srilankanelections.com - A website featuring Sri Lankan elections and results.